The Twizel River is a river of the Mackenzie Basin, in the Canterbury region of New Zealand's South Island. It is part of the Waitaki River system. It was named for Twizel Bridge in Northumberland by John Turnbull Thomson, Chief Surveyor of Otago in the mid 1800s.

The Twizel River has its origins in numerous streams which flow down the eastern flanks of the Ben Ohau Range, the longest of which are the Gladstone Stream and the Duncan Stream. The Twizel River flows south, veering slowly southeast close to the town of Twizel. From here it flows into the northern end of the artificial lake, Lake Benmore.

See also
List of rivers of New Zealand

References

Rivers of Canterbury, New Zealand
Rivers of New Zealand